The Woody Shaw Concert Ensemble at the Berliner Jazztage is a live album led by trumpeter Woody Shaw which was recorded at the JazzFest Berlin in 1976 and released on the Muse label. The Woody Shaw Concert Ensemble at the Berliner Jazztage was reissued by Mosaic Records as part of Woody Shaw: The Complete Muse Sessions in 2013.

Reception

Scott Yanow of Allmusic called it a "frequently exciting and often quite advanced Berlin concert".

Track listing 
 "Hello to the Wind" (Joe Chambers, Gene McDaniels) - 17:27   
 "Obsequioius" (Larry Young) - 9:10   
 "Jean Marie" (Ronnie Mathews) - 9:20   
 "In The Land of the Blacks (Bilad as Sudan)" (René McLean) - 12:24

Personnel 
Woody Shaw - trumpet, percussion
René McLean - alto saxophone, flute, percussion
Frank Foster - tenor saxophone, soprano saxophone, percussion
Slide Hampton - trombone, percussion
Ronnie Mathews - piano
Stafford James - bass
Louis Hayes - drums

References 

Woody Shaw live albums
1977 live albums
Muse Records live albums
Albums produced by Michael Cuscuna